John Rote (March 24, 1928 – February 13, 2017) was an American field hockey player. He competed in the men's tournament at the 1956 Summer Olympics.

References

External links
 

1928 births
2017 deaths
American male field hockey players
Olympic field hockey players of the United States
Field hockey players at the 1956 Summer Olympics
People from Bloemendaal
Dutch emigrants to the United States
Sportspeople from North Holland